Tanguy Cariou (born 21 April 1973) is a French yacht racer who competed in the 2000 Summer Olympics.

He sailed with Areva Challenge at the 2007 Louis Vuitton Cup, and has also raced with Alinghi and the Groupama Sailing Team in the Extreme Sailing Series.

References

External links 
 
 
 
 

1977 births
Living people
French male sailors (sport)
Olympic sailors of France
Sailors at the 2000 Summer Olympics – 470
Extreme Sailing Series sailors
Alinghi sailors
2007 America's Cup sailors
470 class world champions
World champions in sailing for France